Hibbertia superans is a species of flowering plant in the family Dilleniaceae and is endemic to New South Wales. It is a low, spreading shrub with silky-hairy foliage, linear leaves and yellow flowers with six to nine stamens on one side of two carpels.

Description
Flowering occurs from July to September.

Taxonomy
Hibbertia superans was first formally described in 2000 by Hellmut R. Toelken in the Journal of the Adelaide Botanic Gardens from specimens collected near Kellyville in 1998. The specific epithet (superans) means "overtopping", referring to flowers found on old flowering branches.

Distribution and habitat
This hibbertia grows on sandstone ridge-tops in woodland and heathland mainly between Baulkham Hills and South Maroota in the northern outskirts of Sydney.

Conservation status
Hibbertia superans is listed as "endangered" under the New South Wales Government Biodiversity Conservation Act 2016. The main threats to the species include land clearing, habitat disturbance, weed invasion and road and rail maintenance.

See also
List of Hibbertia species

References

superans
Flora of New South Wales
Plants described in 2000
Taxa named by Hellmut R. Toelken